Judi Barrett ( Bauman; born 1941) is an American author of picture books for children, including Cloudy with a Chance of Meatballs and Animals Should Definitely Not Wear Clothing.

Biography
Barrett obtained a B.F.A. in 1962 from the Pratt Institute. She married the artist Ron Barrett, who illustrated some of her most popular books.  After they divorced, they continued to collaborate on books for many years.  She currently resides in Brooklyn, New York.

Selected books
 Old MacDonald Had an Apartment House (illustrated by Ron Barrett), 1969
 Animals Should Definitely Not Wear Clothing (illustrated by Ron Barrett), 1970
 An Apple a Day (illustrated by Tim Lewis), 1973
 Benjamin's 365 Birthdays (illustrated by Ron Barrett), 1974
 Peter's Pocket (illustrated by Julia Noonan), 1974
 I Hate to Take a Bath (illustrated by Charles B. Slackman), 1975
 I Hate to Go to Bed (illustrated by Ray Cruz), Four Winds Press, 1977
 The Wind Thief (illustrated by Diane Dawson), 1977
 Cloudy with a Chance of Meatballs (illustrated by Ron Barrett), 1978
 Animals Should Definitely Not Act Like People (illustrated by Ron Barrett), 1980
 I'm Too Small, You're Too Big (illustrated by David S. Rose), 1981
 A Snake Is Totally Tail (illustrated by L. S. Johnson), 1983
 What's Left?, 1983
 Pickles Have Pimples, and Other Silly Statements (illustrated by L. S. Johnson), 1986
 Pickles to Pittsburgh: The Sequel to Cloudy With a Chance of Meatballs (illustrated by Ron Barrett), 1997
 Old MacDonald Had an Apartment House (illustrated by Ron Barrett), 1998
 The Things That Are Most in the World (illustrated by John Nickle), 1998
 I Know Two Who Said Moo: A Counting and Rhyming Book (illustrated by Daniel Moreton), 2000
 Which Witch Is Which? (illustrated by Sharleen Collicott), 2001
 Never Take a Shark to the Dentist (and Other Things Not To Do) (illustrated by John Nickle), 2008
 The Marshmallow Incident (illustrated by Ron Barrett), 2009
 The Complete Cloudy with a Chance of Meatballs (illustrated by Ron Barrett), 2009
 Santa from Cincinnati (illustrated by Kevin Hawks), 2012
 Planet of the Pies: Cloudy with a Chance of Meatballs 3 (illustrated by Isidre Monés), 2013

References

External links

 

American children's writers
Living people
Writers from New York (state)
1941 births
American women children's writers
21st-century American women